Richard Kelly Smith (born August 25, 1944) is a retired American professional baseball player, an outfielder who appeared in 21 games for the 1969 Washington Senators of Major League Baseball. Smith attended Lenoir-Rhyne College.

Smith was in his sixth season in the Washington farm system when he was recalled from the Triple-A Buffalo Bisons in August after batting .325 in 84 games. He debuted as the Senators' starting left fielder against Tommy John of the Chicago White Sox and notched his first MLB hit, a single, in the sixth inning. But he made only two more hits, both singles, over his next 20 game appearances, and finished his MLB career with three safeties in 28 at bats; he walked four times and fanned seven times.

His minor league baseball career concluded after the 1970 season; he batted .284 in 2,644 minor league at bats during his career.

References

External links

1944 births
Living people
American expatriate baseball players in Canada
Baseball players from North Carolina
Buffalo Bisons (minor league) players
Burlington Senators players
Denver Bears players
Geneva Senators players
Major League Baseball left fielders
People from Lincolnton, North Carolina
Washington Senators (1961–1971) players
Winnipeg Whips players
York White Roses players